Stacy Marie Clinesmith (born April 22, 1978 in Spokane, Washington) is a former professional basketball player in the WNBA and current college assistant coach for Gonzaga University.

College
Clinesmith attended University of California, Santa Barbara and played basketball for four seasons there. She helped the team win four Big West Conference women's basketball tournaments and won the Big West Tournament Most Valuable Player in 2000. She graduated with a Bachelor of Arts degree in sociology.

UC Santa Barbara statistics

Source

WNBA career
Clinesmith was picked in the second round, 30th overall by the Sacramento Monarchs in the 2000 WNBA Draft. Clinesmith only appeared in 56 career WNBA games for both the Monarchs and Detroit Shock.

After WNBA
After leaving the WNBA, Clinesmith was Director of Sports, USA in 2004, which she oversaw all of  basketball operations in Spokane, Washington. From 2005–2007, Clinesmith was Director of the Sports Performance Extreme Enhancement Development (SPEED) program at Whitworth Physical Therapy in Spokane. She was also the owner and manager of Clinesmith Basketball, where she developed, organized and instructed basketball camps for Spokane area middle and high school girls basketball players.

Coaching career
Clinesmith received her first coaching job as Director of Basketball Operations for the Oregon State Beavers women's basketball program during the 2008–2009 season. Clinesmith received her first assistant coaching job at Central Washington Wildcats women's basketball program during the 2010–2011 season. Clinesmith was promoted to interim head coach for the CWU Wildcats in March 2011, but she left to become assistant coach for the Santa Clara Broncos in June of that year. Clinesmith remained as assistant coach for the Broncos until the end of the 2013–2014 season. In May 2014, Clinesmith was hired as an assistant coach for the Gonzaga Bulldogs women's basketball program.

Personal life
Clinesmith has/had hobbies in other sports, such as mountain biking and wakeboarding.

References

External links
WNBA.com: Stacy Clinesmith Bio 
GoZags.com Stacy Clinesmith Bio – Gonzaga University Official Athletic Site – Women's Basketball 

1978 births
Living people
American women's basketball coaches
American women's basketball players
Basketball coaches from Washington (state)
Basketball players from Spokane, Washington
Detroit Shock players
Gonzaga Bulldogs women's basketball coaches
Point guards
Sacramento Monarchs players
Santa Clara Broncos women's basketball coaches
Shooting guards
UC Santa Barbara Gauchos women's basketball coaches
UC Santa Barbara Gauchos women's basketball players